Edgewater is an unincorporated hamlet located in the East Kootenay region of southeastern British Columbia. It was originally founded as a farming community before World War I. Many of its residents were from England, and returned there after the war, causing the community to suffer a decline in population. Edgewater has since recovered, and the area's economy includes forestry, agriculture, and tourism.

Edgewater has couple of major attractions that draw travelers. The area around the community is Christmas tree farmland, and in the summer there is a Saturday Farmer's Market, where tourists can purchase arts and crafts, fresh produce and dairy products. Edgewater is also home to the Steamboat Mountain Music Festival in July.

The community gets its name from being at the edge of the waters of the Columbia River.

Designated places in British Columbia
Columbia Valley
Unincorporated settlements in British Columbia
Populated places in the Regional District of East Kootenay